Frédéric Soulacroix (1858–1933) was a French-Italian painter.

Life and works
Soulacroix was born to well-known fresco painters and sculptors, Charles Soulacroix and Giacinta Diofebo. By the age of 15 years, in 1873, Frédéric entered the Accademia di Belle Arti of Florence, and, in October 1876, he was admitted to its School of Painting. He remained in Florence for many years, painting romantic genre pieces in costume of the 18th or early 19th centuries. Among his works were Diritto di pedaggio; A declaration of Love; A Goodbye; Il brindisi; Per le scale; The message; L'ultimo sguardo; Una confidenza flìrtation; Une incroyable; Buone nuove; Cattive nuove; Leaving for the War; La leggitrìce; and Il regalo dell'amante nel giorno natalizio.

His works can be seen at the Museum of Arts of Philadelphia and at the Lord Mayor collection Mansion House in London.

Images

References

1858 births
1933 deaths
19th-century French painters
French male painters
20th-century French painters
20th-century French male artists
19th-century Italian painters
Italian male painters
20th-century Italian painters
19th-century Italian male artists
19th-century French male artists
20th-century Italian male artists